is a sugoroku mobile phone game published by Namco in 2006. This game contains 10 playable Namco characters as Crossover and five scenarios based on Mappy, The Tower of Druaga, Valkyrie no Densetsu, Sky Kid and Dig Dug II.

References

Mobile games
2006 video games
Crossover video games
Namco games
Video games based on board games
Video games developed in Japan